Jesus Humberto Centeno Bolivar (born December 27, 1985, in Maracay, Venezuela) is a Venezuelan professional basketball player currently signed with Venezuelan team Diablos de Miranda.

Centeno was a prolific junior team member for the Venezuela national basketball team.  He played for the U-19 team at the 2003 FIBA Under-19 World Championship, averaging 10.6 points and 2.4 assists per game for the ninth placed Venezuelans.  He also competed for the Under-21 team at the 2004 Americas Tournament.  He made his debut for the senior team in qualifying for the FIBA Americas Championship 2009.  After the Venezuelans qualified, he was also named to the team that would represent the country in the tournament.

References

External links
 RealGM profile

1985 births
Living people
Bucaneros de La Guaira players
Capitanes de Ciudad de México players
Cocodrilos de Caracas players
Guaiqueríes de Margarita players
Guards (basketball)
Marinos B.B.C. players
Sportspeople from Maracay
Venezuelan expatriate basketball people in Ecuador
Venezuelan expatriate basketball people in Mexico
Venezuelan men's basketball players